The Kentucky–Tennessee rivalry is a college sports rivalry between the University of Kentucky Wildcats and the University of Tennessee Volunteers.

The football rivalry was once a trophy game known as the Battle for the Barrel, with the victors keeping a painted wooden beer barrel, one half each painted in Vol orange the other in Wildcat blue, until the next contest. The barrel tradition was mutually discontinued in 1998 following a fatal alcohol-related car crash involving two Kentucky football players.

The rivalry is sometimes known as the 'Border Battle.

Football

Basketball

In contrast to the football series, Kentucky has generally dominated the basketball rivalry. The two teams first played in 1910. For the first couple decades the series was often back and forth, and the rivalry became particularly heated in the 1930s and 1940s, when the Volunteers were coached by John Mauer. Mauer had previously been the coach of Kentucky until he was let go and replaced by Adolph Rupp, adding additional bitterness to the rivalry. Under Mauer, the Volunteers held their own against the ascendant Wildcats. However, from 1945 to 1960, Kentucky won 31 out of 32 games, including a series-record 20 consecutive wins from 1950 to 1960. Overall, Kentucky and Tennessee have met for a total of 232 times and Kentucky has the winning advantage of 157–76.

One particularly notable game was the 1972 match-up at Tennessee. Kentucky had won the previous game by two points, but Ray Mears' Tennessee team surprised the league by achieving the best record to that point. If Tennessee won, they would be sole SEC champions and receive the conference's bid for the NCAA tournament; however, a Kentucky win meant a shared SEC title, with Kentucky receiving the tournament bid via tiebreaker. Kentucky won the game 67–66 after a last minute missed Tennessee free throw, splitting the conference title and taking away Tennessee's hopes of a tournament bid.

The rivalry has been among the biggest for both schools. Tennessee claims the most victories against Kentucky of any program in men's college basketball.

Game results 
The following table displays the complete list of game results. in the rivalry. Kentucky victories are shaded in blue, while Tennessee wins are shaded in orange.

Women's Basketball 
As one of the sports most dominant programs, the Tennessee Lady Vols have controlled the rivalry against Kentucky, leading the all time series 57-16. While the rivalry may take a back seat to Tennessee's series with UConn, Stanford, Georgia, LSU, and Vanderbilt, as well as Kentucky's longstanding rivalry with South Carolina, the rivalry has gotten especially competitive in the last decade. The teams have met in 4 SEC Tournament title games in 1982, 2010, 2011, and 2014, and Tennessee leads the series in these games 3-1. From 2010-2016, the teams met in 13 straight games where both teams were ranked in the top 25, favoring Tennessee 9-4. Under former head coach Matthew Mitchell, Kentucky rose to national prominence and won 2 consecutive games against Tennessee for the first time ever over the 2013 and 2014 seasons, and the series is now tied 5-5 in the last 10 meetings.

See also 

 Most-played rivalries in NCAA Division I FBS

References

University of Tennessee Athletics Women's Basketball History vs University of Kentucky (utsports.com)

College basketball rivalries in the United States
Kentucky Wildcats basketball
Tennessee Volunteers basketball
College baseball rivalries in the United States